Kouris Dam, is the largest dam of a network of 107 dams in Cyprus. It is in the Limassol District and is fed by the Kouris River along with other smaller watercourses including the Diarizos River which has its water diverted to Kouris Dam via an underground pipeline.

History

It has an overall catchment area of 2. For its construction the whole village of Alassa had to be relocated to a nearby site overlooking the reservoir (between the Kouris and Limnatis valleys) at a cost of around CYP£5,000,000.

Its construction was opposed by environmental groups concerned about the effects of water diversion on the Limassol Salt Lake, a wetland located downstream to the rivers and used by migratory birds. The dam is part of the Southern Conveyor Project, which carries water from the SW side of Cyprus to the SE part of the island, over a distance of 120 km. The dam has a central clay core zoned earthfill embankment with a height of 110m and a crest length of approximately 550 metres providing a water storage volume of 115 million cubic metres.

The construction of the dam was first proposed by the Cyprus Water Development board in 1968. Following several feasibility studies the French engineering company Sogreah completed the detailed design in 1981. The contract for its construction was awarded in January 1984 to a consortium comprising J&P construction and Impregilo of Italy.

The construction cost amounted to CYP £29,000,000. Part of the funding came from the European Investment Bank. Construction was completed in September 1988.  It was officially inaugurated by the then president, George Vassiliou, on 22 April 1989.

Since its construction it has overflowed three times: on March 4, 2004,  on April 6, 2012,
and on January 7, 2020.

In popular culture
In 2008, rumours held that a crocodile or other large reptile was swimming in the dam, leading to humorous references to a "Cyprus Loch Ness Monster." Local community leaders authorized a search but did not find such a creature.

Gallery

See also  
 List of reservoirs and dams in Cyprus

References

Dams in Cyprus
Dams completed in 1988
Buildings and structures in Limassol District
1988 establishments in Cyprus